Events from the year 1290 in Ireland.

Incumbent
Lord: Edward I

Events
18 July – the Edict of Expulsion is issued expelling all Jews from England and Ireland by 1 November.
White Abbey, Kildare, is founded by William de Vesci; it is run by Carmelite friars.

Births
 Thomas FitzGerald, 3rd Baron Desmond

Deaths
Sithric "Carrach in Cairn" Mág Tighearnán

References